HMAS Bunbury (J241/M241), named for the city of Bunbury, Western Australia, was one of 60 s constructed during World War II, and one of 36 initially manned and commissioned solely by the Royal Australian Navy (RAN).

Design and construction

In 1938, the Australian Commonwealth Naval Board (ACNB) identified the need for a general purpose 'local defence vessel' capable of both anti-submarine and mine-warfare duties, while easy to construct and operate. Construction of the prototype  did not go ahead, but the plans were retained. The need for locally built 'all-rounder' vessels at the start of World War II saw the "Australian Minesweepers" (designated as such to hide their anti-submarine capability, but popularly referred to as "corvettes") approved in September 1939, with 60 constructed during the course of the war: 36 (including Bunbury) ordered by the RAN, 20 ordered by the British Admiralty but manned and commissioned as RAN vessels, and 4 for the Royal Indian Navy.

Bunbury was laid down by Evans Deakin and Company at Brisbane on 1 November 1941, launched on 16 May 1942 by Mrs. F. A. Cooper, wife of the Treasurer of Queensland, and commissioned on 3 January 1943.

Operational history

1943
After commissioning, Bunbury was assigned to escort duties, first along the east coast of Australia amid increased attacks on supply ships by Japanese submarines and later between her Townsville base, Port Moresby and Milne Bay. Along with a number of other Bathurst-class ships, Bunbury participated in a ferry service transporting troops and supplies to Oro Bay in the aftermath of the battle of Buna–Gona in early 1943.

1944
Departing Melbourne in March 1944 following refit, Bunbury returned to New Guinea but was forced to return to Brisbane in April after running aground at Cape Cretin. Following repairs, the ship performed escort duties in the vicinity of Darwin and by September had proceeded to Fremantle for anti-submarine exercises. On 17 December 1944, Bunbury was involved in a collision with the submarine  while operating out of Fremantle, requiring further repairs lasting a month.

1945
After concluding exercises with American submarines off Fremantle, Bunbury again sailed for New Guinea on 17 April for her last wartime patrol. On 15 May, in company with the sloop , Bunbury shelled Japanese targets at Wewak in support of Australian ground forces. During this patrol, she also performed Guard ship duties at Morotai and Biak, departing for Adelaide in July.

Following the Japanese surrender, Bunbury joined the 20th Minesweeping Flotilla in November, operating in South Australia and Tasmania until May 1946 when she left the flotilla and sailed for Sydney.

Fate
The corvette received two battle honours for her service during World War II; "Pacific 1943–45" and "New Guinea 1943–44". The ship's bell is displayed in her namesake city of Bunbury.

Citations

References

Books

Journal and news articles

Bathurst-class corvettes of the Royal Australian Navy
Ships built in Queensland
1942 ships
World War II corvettes of Australia